Barranca de Yaco or Barranca Yaco (from the Spanish barranca (gully) and the Quechua yaku (water)) is a geographical feature along the ancient camino real (royal road) of the Viceroyalty of the Río de la Plata, located between Villa Tulumba and Sinsacate, in the province of Córdoba, Argentina.

The place is famous because General Juan Facundo Quiroga, Governor and caudillo of La Rioja, was assassinated there by a party led by Santos Pérez, on 16 February 1835, during the Argentine Civil Wars. Santos Pérez along with the former Governor of Córdoba José Vicente Reynafé and two of his brothers were judged and hanged for this crime at Buenos Aires in 1837. Since 2009 there is a memorial square that remembers Quiroga and those killed with him.

See also
Juan Facundo Quiroga
Facundo
Juan Manuel de Rosas

Notes

Geography of Córdoba Province, Argentina